Deuterophysa costimaculalis is a moth in the family Crambidae. It was described by Warren in 1889. It is found in Brazil.

References

Moths described in 1889
Pyraustinae